Zliv is a town in České Budějovice District in the South Bohemian Region of the Czech Republic. It has about 3,500 inhabitants.

History
The first written mention of Zliv is from 1409, when it was a serfdom village of the Hluboká estate. By the end of the 19th century the economic expansion of the village occurred and factories for production of ceramics and grog were founded.

References

External links

Populated places in České Budějovice District
Cities and towns in the Czech Republic